Bikita is a district in the Masvingo Province of Zimbabwe. It borders with Gutu District, Zaka District, Chipinge District, Chiredzi District, Buhera District and Mwenezi District. Its administration is at Nyika Growth Point but initially it was at Bikita Office, 11km south of Nyika towards Jerara Growth Point in Zaka District.

The surrounding area is mined for lithium, Bikita mine being one example. The reputed to have the largest reserve of petalite in the world.

Name
Its name probably is derived from a mountain in the Bikita Mamutse Area called Bikita Mt. Speculation was it came from the Shona word Dikita which means antbear, which describes the shape of a nearby hill. The district used to be known as Denga which means up in the clouds and has moved several times to different locations.

Government and politics 

The district sends three members to Zimbabwe's House of Assembly.  Each of the wards in the district has an elected official who works at the rural district council.

The district was divided into three sections for the 2008 elections, namely east, west and south. The district was a stronghold of ZANU-PF from 1980 until the time of the 2008 parliamentary election, when the opposition Movement for Democratic Change (MDC) won all three seats, one with a razor thin margin.

Bikita South 

Bikita South, Zaka east and central, is made of wards 1, 2, 3, 4, 6, 7, 8, 26, 28, and 29. During the 2008 House of Assembly elections, Luka Gumbare (ZANU-PF), Wilson Makonya (MDC (mut)) and Jani Varandeni (MDC (tsv)) ran for the seat. The Zimbabwe Electoral Commission (ZEC) announced Jani Marandeni as the winner with a total of 6,916 votes to 5,284 of Luka Gumbare. Matsai community is one of the most impoverished in Bikita but it has its shining beacon Mashoko mission with a renowned hospital and state-of-the-art high school. Ward 28 and 29 is made up of small scale commercial farms. These farms were mostly purchased in the early 1950s. During the 2018 House of Assembly elections JOSIAH SITHOLE [JK] (ZANU PF) was announced the winner by ZEC with a total of 10300 votes followed by Jeppy Jaboon (MDC Alliance) with 3000 votes.

Bikita East 

Bikita East comprises wards 14, 15, 16, 17, 18, 20, 21, 24, 25, and 27. Matthew Makaza (ZANU-PF), Walter Mutsauri (independent) and Edmore Marima (MDC (Tsva)) ran for the seat for the House of Assembly. According to the ZEC, Edmore Marima won the seat with 7,784 votes to 5,373 polled by Walter Mutsauri.

Bikita West 

The constituency seat is made up of eleven wards, namely 5, 9, 10, 11, 12, 13, 16, 22, 23, and 32. Ellias Musakwa (ZANU-PF) and Heya Shoko (MDC (tsv)) ran for the seat. Shoko narrowly won the seat with 7,048 votes to Musakwa's 7,029.

Development 

 Bikita Forum
 Silveira Tarred Road
District Development Fund (DDF)

References 

 
Districts of Masvingo Province
Populated places in Zimbabwe